HMS Gaspée (or HMS Gaspe or HMS Gaspé) was purchased in North America in 1772, commissioned in 1773, and captured in 1775. The Royal Navy recaptured her in 1776. She was recommissioned and served again until prepared for disposal at the end of 1777. At some point she was at the "Battle of Fundy", but when this occurred and what her role was is currently obscure.

Career
Lieutenant William Hunter commissioned Gaspée in January 1773. In 1775 she arrived at Quebec to take on provisions. There Colonel Guy Carleton, Lieutenant-Governor of the province of Quebec, prevailed upon Hunter to take some his men to Lake Champlain and there take command of a vessel that Carleton was having built at St Johns. The British were forced to surrender St Johns on 3 November to the advancing American forces. A bombardment had sunk Royal Savage; Hunter and 14 of his men were among the prisoners-of-war.

In September Gaspee carried the captured American leader Ethan Allen from Montreal to Quebec.

In Lieutenant Hunter's absence, command of Gaspée devolved on Mr. Chase, her master. She and  escorted a convoy of merchantmen from Nova Scotia to Boston, Massachusetts. They were at anchor outside the harbour when two American privateers came up and captured them on 23 November.

On 3 May 1776 ,, and  sailed up the St Lawrence River to the relief of Quebec. Surprise and Martin sailed ahead to "annoy" the retreating American troops. On their way they captured an American schooner armed with four 6-pounder and six 3-pounder guns, and recovered Gaspée. The Americans had scuttled Gaspée, but the British were able to weigh her and discovered that she was little damaged.

In July 1776 Lieutenant George Wilson recommissioned Gaspée at Quebec; she was still under his command in 1777. She was paid off on 13 December 1777 for disposal.

Notes, citations, and references
Notes

Citations

References
 
 
 

1773 ships
Brigs of the Royal Navy
Schooners of the Royal Navy
Captured ships